Siemens Gamesa Renewable Energy S.A., formerly Gamesa Corporación Tecnológica S.A. and Grupo Auxiliar Metalúrgico S.A., is a Spanish-German wind engineering company based in Zamudio, Biscay, Spain. In Spain, the company has two other main sites one in Madrid and the other one in Sarriguren (Navarre). The Services Commercial Office is located in the Parque de la Innovación de Navarra in Sarriguren. It manufactures wind turbines and provides onshore and offshore wind services. It is the world's second largest wind turbine manufacturer.

The company is notable for its SG 14.0-222 wind turbine, the largest variant based on the Siemens D7 Platform, as well as being the largest wind turbine in the world. Its main competition will be the General Electric Haliade-X and the MHI-Vestas V164.

History

Gamesa Corporación Tecnológica
Gamesa began operations in 1976 as Grupo Auxiliar Metalúrgico S.A., focused at that time on developing new technologies and applying them to emerging activities. These included robotics, microelectronics, aeronautics and the development of composite materials. It was founded by Juan Luis Arregui and Joseba Mikel Grajales.

In 1994, Gamesa Eólica was created as a subsidiary specializing in the manufacture of wind turbines. The company became involved in the development, construction and operations of wind farms in 1995 and completed its first wind farm the following year. Gamesa had a 7-year partnership with Vestas that ended in 2002.

The corporation was officially listed on the stock exchange on 31 October 2000 and joined the selective IBEX 35 on 24 April 2001. In 2002, Gamesa acquired gearboxes manufacturer Echesa, generators manufacturer Cantarey, and converters manufacturer Enertrón.

Since 2006, the company has focused on technologies associated with sustainable energy, principally wind power. It has divested of its interests in aeronautics, which were sold off to form a new company known as Aernnova, and in services, which were sold off to form a new company known as Global Energy Services.

As part of the United Kingdom's move to expand its production of offshore wind energy production, Gamesa has committed to the expenditure of £133.7 million on a production factory and other facilities in the UK, and will also move its offshore wind division headquarters to London.

In January 2014, Gamesa and French nuclear manufacturer Areva announced a preliminary deal to create a joint venture Adwen in the offshore wind power business.
In early 2015 Gamesa continued its expansion of UK services by acquiring B9 Energy.

In 2017, Areva sold its stake in Adwen to Gamesa, after the merger of Gamesa and Siemens Wind Power was announced.

Siemens Wind Power
History of Siemens Wind Power A/S started in 1980, when Danish irrigation system manufacturer Danregn diversified into the windturbine business.

The company changed its name from Danregn Vindkraft to Bonus Energy in 1983, an easier name for the English speaking North American market.

In 1991, eleven 450 kW Bonus turbines were installed in the Vindeby Offshore Wind Farm, the first offshore wind farm in the world.

The company sourced its first blades from Viborg based company Økær Vind Energi. Later it sourced blades from LM Wind Power. In the late 1990s Bonus began to develop its own blades, beginning production in the early 2000s in Aalborg.

Bonus A/S was sold to Siemens AG in 2004. The sales and project management headquarters moved to Hamburg, Germany in May 2009.

In 2006, Siemens acquired a former LM Glasfiber wind turbine blade factory in Engesvang, Denmark. In 2007, it constructed a blade factory in Fort Madison, Iowa, United States. A hub factory in Ølgod began production in 2008. A nacelle manufacturing plant was opened in Hutchinson, Kansas in December 2010. Additionally Bonus Energy sales and service partner company AN Windenergie GmbH in Bremen (Germany) was acquired in 2005.

In mid-2008 the company began testing of development prototypes of direct drive wind turbines; units based on the geared SWT-3.6–107 were installed in 2008 with a permanent magnet generator directly replacing the gearbox and alternator; Successful tests led to development of a new production design by 2009. A prototype of the new direct drive design, an IEC 61400 wind class IA, 3 MW machine (SWT 3.0–101 DD) was installed near Brande, Denmark in 2009. The 3 MW design was launched as a product in April 2010 and significantly reduced complexity (half the components) and lower nacelle weight than earlier 2.3 MW designs. A 2.3 MW version for lower wind speeds (SWT-2.3–113) was launched in 2011.

In 2010 Siemens Wind Power acquired 49% of A2SEA (an offshore wind farm installation company) from DONG Energy (now Ørsted A/S). In 2017, A2SEA was sold to GeoSea.

A factory established in Linggang (Siemens Wind Power Blades (Shanghai) Co., Ltd.) near the Yangshan Deep Water Port began production in 2010. Additionally in December 2010 Siemens announced it would install a blade factory at an existing unused facility in Tillsonburg, Ontario, Canada. In early 2011 Siemens and ABP announced the development of a £210 million turbine assembly plant, and dock development at Alexandra Dock, in Kingston upon Hull, UK.

In May 2011 testing began of a prototype 6 MW direct drive design with a  rotor, the design was launched as a product in November 2011. In 2013 Siemens announced a development of its 3.6 MW design, the SWT 4.0–130 which used a rotor of diameter 130m with 4 MW rated power. At the same time the company introduced new product platform codes for its products, with 'G' indicating geared drive, and 'D' indicating direct drive, suffixed by a number indicating an approximate power class. The four initial product ranges were Siemens G2, G4, D3 and D6.

In July 2012, the company agreed to supply DONG Energy with 300 direct drive, 75m blade, 6 MW SWT-6.0–154 turbines for the English offshore market from 2014. Two turbines are to be installed for testing at the Gunfleet Sands offshore wind farm. The value of the contract was estimated at over £2 billion. Prototype 6 MW machines were installed at the Gunfleet Sands 2 wind farm in 2013; with the first full scale commercial installation of 6 MW machines at the 210 MW Westernmost Rough wind farm in 2014.
In September 2012 Siemens Wind announced the lay off of 615 of a workforce of around 1650 workers in the United States, citing reduced demand for wind turbines due to uncertainty concerning future tax break incentives in the US for wind power. (see United States Wind Energy Policy.)

In March 2014 Siemens and Associated British Ports (ABP) finalised the 2011 MOU to build a turbine factory in Hull, UK (Green Port Hull), and announced an additional facility near Paull, East Riding of Yorkshire, east of Hull which would manufacture rotor blades for turbines. In 2014 the planned factory at Paull was abandoned, with all production to be concentrated at the Alexandra dock site. Revised plans for the site submitted April 2015 included only a blade manufacturing factory at the site with no nacelle production.

In 2015 Siemens upgraded its 6 MW offshore design to a rated 7 MW power with a larger permanent magnet generator, and further to 8 MW in 2016. The first order for the 7 MW design was awarded in October 2015 for 47 turbines in the Walney 3 offshore.

In early 2015 Siemens announced it had reached agreements to build 2 GW of wind turbines in Egypt, and to construct a blade factory in that country, as part of a larger power generation agreement. The €8 billion, 16.4 GW energy development deal was signed in June 2015, including an approximate 1000 worker blade factory in Ain Soukhna and 12 wind farms (600 turbine, 2 GW) in the Gulf of Suez and west Nile areas of Egypt.

In August 2015 Siemens announced it was to construct a new nacelle manufacturing plant at Cuxhaven, Germany, an investment of £200 million. The plant was expected to become operational mid 2017, and employ 1000 people. A€100 million blade plant to be built in the Tanger Automotive City (near Tanger-Med port) in Morocco was announced in early 2016.

In February 2017 Siemens announced the closure of the Engesvang blade factory (Denmark), with the loss of 430 jobs, citing the plants inability to produce larger size blades.

Merger
On 17 July 2016 Siemens and Gamesa announced their plan to merge their wind businesses, with the 59% stake of Siemens and the 41% stake of former Gamesa shareholders in the resulting company. Siemens paid €1 billion cash for its stake in Gamesa. The resultant company was headquartered in Spain, with an offshore operations headquartered in Hamburg, Germany and Vejle, Denmark. The combined business was the largest wind turbine manufacturer worldwide by installed capacity (~69 GW). The merger became effective on 3 April 2017.

Post-merger
In 2018, Siemens Gamesa won the wind turbine supply contract for the largest offshore wind farm in the world. It is a project of the Danish group Ørsted located in English waters, specifically 89 kilometers from the east of the coast, in which it will also carry out maintenance, and will install its SG 8.0-167 DD model turbines, with a total capacity of 1,386 MW. In the company's history, it is the largest project, ahead of Hornsea One (1,218 MW), also developed by Ørsted.

In 2018, Taiwanese manufacturer Swancor began supplying wind turbine resin to Siemens Gamesa.

In 2019, Siemens Gamesa agreed to purchase Senvion's European service fleet for €200 million ($222 million). On 18 May 2021, the CNMV suspended Siemens Gamesa from trading while it considered a delisting.

In 2022, Siemens Gamesa began partnering with Taiwan-based green material producer Swancor Holding Co., and signed an agreement to install 3GW of offshore wind power in Taiwan.

Products

Onshore turbines

Offshore turbines

Operations
Siemens Wind has R&D, and production facilities in Brande, Denmark. Blade production is located in Aveiro (Portugal), Aalborg (Denmark), Tanger Automotive City (Morocco), Linggang (China), Fort Madison, Iowa (USA) and Tillsonburg, Ontario (Canada); with factories under construction or planned (2016) for Kingston upon Hull (UK) and Ain Soukhna (Egypt).
By 2018, the hub factory in Ølgod was moved to the production in Brande.

Other established production sites included nacelle manufacture at Hutchinson, Kansas (USA, 1.6 GW). As of 2018 the new offshore nacelle plant has been opened at Cuxhaven (Germany). Another offshore nacelle plant opened in Taiwan in 2021.

Siemens acquired the first of two Roll-on/roll-off turbine transport ships in 2016, converted from a container ship, to reduce logistics costs. A telescopic roof also allows Lift-on/lift-off with cranes.

Recognition 
Siemens Gamesa is listed on the Dow Jones Sustainability Index, the FTSE4Good Index which is concerned with corporate social responsibility on the KLD Global Climate 100 Index, and on the Global 100 Index of the 100 most sustainable companies in the world.

See also 

 Wind power
 Wind power in Spain
 Wind power in the United States
 Wind power in the European Union
 Wind power in China
 Wind power in the United Kingdom
 List of wind turbine manufacturers
 REpower
 Vestas

References

Notes

2016 mergers and acquisitions
Basque companies
Companies listed on the Madrid Stock Exchange
Engineering companies of Spain
IBEX 35
Manufacturing companies established in 1976
Manufacturing companies of Spain
Renewable energy technology companies
Siemens
Spanish brands
Spanish companies established in 1976
Wind power in Spain
Wind turbine manufacturers
Biscay